The Seal of Burlington County, New Jersey consists of a wagon proceeding over a cement causeway with seagulls in attendance. The wording around the seal is "Board of Chosen Freeholders of Burlington County, New Jersey", the name of the county legislature.

Burlington County, New Jersey
Burlington County